The General Post Office (abbreviated: GPO) is the main post office in Lahore, Pakistan. Located at GPO Chowk on Mall Road (Shahrah-e-Quaid-e-Azam) near Anarkali, the GPO is Pakistan's largest. On average, it handles 20,000 pieces of mail per day.

History
It was built in 1887 to commemorate Queen Victoria's Golden Jubilee and replaced the telegraph office of Anarkali Bazar. The building was designed and built by Sir Ganga Ram, one of the leading architects of that time, and was built near the shrine of the 17th century saint Shah Chiragh.

Building
The building consists of two main halls and two minarets.

Conservation
It was the first British era building to be conserved in the city. The work was carried out by Yasmeen Lari and Associations. On 21 August 1996, the Post Office issued a stamp commemorating its restoration.

See also

 Other General Post Offices

References

Buildings and structures in Lahore
Post office buildings in Pakistan
Postal system of Pakistan
The Mall, Lahore